Schwanstetten is a municipality in the district of Roth, in Bavaria, Germany. Schwanstetten is located 15 km south of Nuremberg.

Geography

Division of the municipality
After the local government reforms of 1978 Schwanstetten consists of 6 districts:
 Leerstetten
 Schwand
 Furth
 Mittelhembach
 Harm
 Hagershof

History
The town district Schwand was first mentioned in 1186, another one, Leerstetten, in 1194.

Mayors
since 2008: Robert Pfann (SPD)
1996–2008:Dietmar Koltzenburg
1990–1996: Alfred Herzig 
1984–1990: Leonhard Kohl
1978–1984: Fritz Meyer

Twin towns
  La Haye-du-Puits (Normandy, France) – since 1988

References

External links
  

Roth (district)